Sabana de la Mar, usually spelled in English as Savana de la Mar, is a town in the Hato Mayor province of the Dominican Republic.

Sabana de la Mar is located in the northeastern of Dominican Republic, on the southern side of Samaná Bay.  It is an urban area with 508.52 km2.

History
It was founded in 1760, foundation initiated by the Governor Francisco Rubio and Peñaranda in 1756 at the same time as the one of the Peninsula of Santa Bárbara of Samaná, along with a group of explorers from the Canary Islands. Eventually, other Europeans came to the community: Swiss, Italians, and the working class of African descent.

Tourism
The economy of 10,582 inhabitants is based on agriculture, fishing, and Government jobs.  A large portion of the Los Haitises National Park and the San Lorenzo Bay are located in Sabana de la Mar. Environmental issues are a great concern for this community. 

Since the 20th Century, Sabana de la Mar has been recognized as the birthplace, on December 1, 1892, of Señorita Elupina Cordero. She became blind at a very early age and developed a mystical and religious personality that has attracted thousands of followers. While alive, she was known for curing different types of illnesses with her prayers, touch, and natural remedies using herbs she grew in her garden. 

There is the Chapel Señorita Elupina Cordero, where she is buried. It has become a must pilgrimage for hundreds of people from all over. There is also, on the grounds of the Chapel, a free school from Kindergarten to 8th grade. The Chapel is located on Calle Elupina Cordero and Calle 27 de Febrero. The hospital of Sabana de la Mar is also named Hospital Señorita Elupina Cordero to honor, acknowledge and remember her healing powers. Her miracles have been documented regularly, and Señorita Elupina Cordero is in the process for cannonization by the Catholic Church. She died on June 4, 1939. Every year, hundreds of people come to Sabana de la Mar for her Memorial on June 4.

Climate

Notable residents
Luis Severino, baseball player

References

Sources 
 – World-Gazetteer.com

Populated places in Hato Mayor Province
Municipalities of the Dominican Republic